Suphan Hardkam (born February 2, 1986) is a professional footballer from Thailand.

Honours

Club
Ubon Ratchathani
 Thai Division 2 League Champions (1) : 2014

References

1986 births
Living people
Suphan Hardkam
Suphan Hardkam
Association football defenders
Suphan Hardkam
Suphan Hardkam
Suphan Hardkam
Suphan Hardkam
Suphan Hardkam